= Puerta de San José =

Coordinates: 27°33′S 67°01′W

- Municipality and village
- Interactive map of Puerta de San José
- Country: Argentina
- Province: Catamarca Province
- Time zone: UTC−3 (ART)

Puerta de San José is a village and municipality in Catamarca Province in northwestern Argentina.
